Christine Wetherill Stevenson (April 12, 1878 – November 21, 1922) was an heiress of the Pittsburgh Paint Company and founder of the Philadelphia Art Alliance.

In later years, her goal was to build her own open-air theatre and hold her own plays, an objective which she achieved shortly before her death in 1922. Establishing the Pilgrimage Theatre (now known as the John Anson Ford Amphitheatre) in a rural section of Los Angeles County, she then played a major role in creating that theater's first production, Life of Christ, which received significant advance newspaper coverage and was described "an American Oberammergau."

Biography
Born on April 12, 1878 in Philadelphia, Pennsylvania as Christine Wetherill, she was a daughter of Samuel Price Wetherill (1846-1926) and Christine (Northrop) Wetherill (1852-1930). Her father was a descendant of Samuel Wetherill, who was a fellow member, with Betsy Ross, of the Free Quaker Meeting House. 

Christine Wetherill was married twice, first to John V. Rice, Jr., whom she divorced in 1902, and then to William Yorke Stevenson, son of Cornelius and Sara Yorke Stevenson, in 1908.

During the late 1910s and early 1920s, Stevenson formed an art alliance with Marie Rankin Clarke, and raised money with her to buy a piece of land on Cahuenga Pass called "Daisy Dell". They then rehearsed together for their first play there, Light of Asia. A second series of plays was planned, The Pilgrimage, when resistance was met from Clarke and others in the group who wanted to expand the venue's themes. Leaving them to form the Hollywood Bowl, she bought twenty-nine acres of land on the other side of Cahuenga Pass to build a new amphitheater for her plays, naming it The Pilgrimage Theatre, and created the Pilgrimage Play. 

Today The Pilgrimage Theatre is known as the John Anson Ford Amphitheatre in Los Angeles.

The Hollywood Pilgrimage Memorial Monument (HCM No. 617), a thirty-two-foot-high steel cross, at 2580 Cahuenga Boulevard was erected in 1923 to the memory of Miss Stevenson.

Stevenson was also known as the founder of the Philadelphia Art Alliance, which is housed in the former Samuel Price Wetherill Mansion.

Death, interment and memorial service
She died in Media, Pennsylvania on November 21, 1922, and was interred at Philadelphia's Laurel Hill Cemetery.

A memorial service was held in her honor on Sunday, November 26, 1922 at 3:00 p.m. in the Pilgrimage Theater. In pre-memorial announcements about the planned event, newspapers reported: "Hollywood is asked to attend the service, and pay tribute in all reverence to the woman who brought the Pilgrimage Play to Hollywood."

Timeline – Hollywood Bowl and Pilgrimage Theatre
 1916 – Hollywood's first outdoor theatre production takes place in nearby Beachwood Canyon.
 1918 – First organizational meeting leads to plans for a permanent park and art center in Hollywood; Christine Wetherill Stevenson produces the religious drama, Light of Asia, on the grounds of the Theosophical Society above Beachwood Canyon.
 1919 – Theatre Arts Alliance incorporated, with Christine Wetherill Stevenson as president; purchase of 59 acres in Bolton Canyon for $47,500 on which to build a community park and art center.
 1920 – Christine leaves the Theatre Art Alliance and purchases 29 acres of land on the other side of Cahuenga Pass to build a new amphitheater for her plays. 
 1920 – Community Park and Art Association established, replacing Theatre Arts Alliance
 1922 – Christine Wetherill Stevenson dies
 1929 – Fire destroys Pilgrimage Theatre and theatre rebuilt

References

External links
 Pilgrimage Theatre, Los Angeles
 History Hollywood Bowl

1878 births
1922 deaths
20th-century American actresses
20th-century American dramatists and playwrights
Actresses from Philadelphia
American philanthropists
American women dramatists and playwrights
Writers from Philadelphia